Bagan Jermal is a state constituency in Penang, Malaysia, that has been represented in the Penang State Legislative Assembly.

The state constituency was first contested in 1974 and is mandated to return a single Assemblyman to the Penang State Legislative Assembly under the first-past-the-post voting system. , the State Assemblyman for Bagan Jermal is Soon Lip Chee from Democratic Action Party (DAP), which is part of the state's ruling coalition, Pakatan Harapan (PH).

Definition

Polling districts 
According to the federal gazette issued on 30 March 2018, the Bagan Jermal constituency is divided into 9 polling districts.

Demographics

History 
The Bagan Jermal state constituency was created and first contested during the 1974 State Election. Ong Yi How, a politician from Pekemas first held the Bagan Jermal seat in 1974.

Election results

See also 
 Constituencies of Penang

References

Penang state constituencies